The Dungeons & Dragons Companion Set is an expansion boxed set for the Dungeons & Dragons (D&D) fantasy role-playing game. It was first published in 1984 as an expansion to the Dungeons & Dragons Basic Set.

Publication history
The Dungeons & Dragons Basic Set was revised in 1983 by Frank Mentzer as Dungeons & Dragons Set 1: Basic Rules. Between 1983 and 1985, this system was revised and expanded by Mentzer as a series of five boxed sets, including the Basic Rules, Expert Rules (supporting character levels 4 through 14), Companion Rules (supporting levels 15 through 25), Master Rules (supporting levels 26 through 36),<ref>Gygax, Gary, Frank Mentzer. Dungeons & Dragons Set 4: Master Rules (TSR, 1985)</ref> and Immortal Rules (supporting Immortals – characters who had transcended levels). The Companion Rules set was written by Mentzer, with art by Larry Elmore and Jeff Easley. It was published by TSR in 1984 as a boxed set containing a 64-page book and a 32-page book. The set contains two booklets: Player's Companion: Book One and Dungeon Master's Companion: Book Two, which were edited by Anne Gray.

The 10th Anniversary Dungeons & Dragons Collector's Set boxed set, published by TSR in 1984, included the rulebooks from the Basic, Expert, and Companion sets; modules AC2, AC3, B1, B2, and M1, Blizzard Pass; Player Character Record Sheets; and dice. This set was limited to 1,000 copies and was sold by mail and at GenCon 17.

Contents
The Player's Companion covers information on character levels 15-25. The book begins with commentary on the changes since a character began as an adventurer at level one. It introduces new weapons, armor types, and unarmed combat rules as well as providing details on running a stronghold and its recurrent costs, such as wages of the castle staff. The Player's Companion details the new abilities and increases in skills, spells, and other abilities that accrue to members of each character class as they rise in level. This section concentrates wholly on human characters, treating dwarves, elves, and halflings separately. The concept of "attack rank" is introduced for the three demi-human classes; although, per the Expert Set rules, they are capped at a specified maximum level, further accumulation of experience points increases their combat abilities. It also introduces the optional character class of druid, presented as a special progression for clerics of neutral alignment.

The Dungeon Master's Companion begins with general guidelines on running a campaign and planning adventures for characters of level 15 and higher. The introduction also constructs a feudal system to provide a basis for the dominions, which will be granted to or conquered by the player characters. This section ends with notes on the organization and running of tournaments. The next section "The War Machine" was designed by Douglas Niles and Gary Spiegel as a method for coping with large-scale battles, especially those in the campaign's background. This book covers running high-level campaigns, including mass combat, other worlds and planes, and new monsters and treasure. It also contains three mini-scenarios.

Reception
The Companion Set was reviewed by Megan C. Robertson in issue 61 of White Dwarf magazine (January 1985), rating it a 7 out of 10 overall. Robertson noted that most characters that reach 15th level in the Basic D&D game should be thinking of settling down and retiring and felt that the D&D Companion Set'' provides: "some ideas for this to be a little more interesting than simple retirement".

References

Dungeons & Dragons sourcebooks
Role-playing game supplements introduced in 1984